Shiming is a Chinese dictionary that employed phonological glosses, believed to date from c. 200 [CE].

Shiming may refer to:

Li Shiming (disambiguation), multiple people
Zou Shiming, Chinese professional boxer